The Essential Beatles is a greatest hits compilation album by The Beatles which was exclusive to Australia and New Zealand on the Apple Records label.  All of the songs featured on the album (with the exception of "With a Little Help from My Friends") reached the top 3 in the Australian charts as singles and EP tracks.

Most of the songs on the album are presented in true stereo, while  "Love Me Do", "P.S. I Love You" and "Baby You're A Rich Man" are in "fake stereo".  Two notable mastering glitches appear on the album: "Penny Lane" running slow with a noticeable "warble" and "Long Tall Sally" on this album, has the stereo channels reversed.

The album was reissued twice in the 1980s.  The first time as part of the Superstars of the '70s box set, released by the Australian branch of World Record Club in August 1980. The second being in December 1982, where it was paired with the Barry Miles book The Beatles In Their Own Words in a box set titled: The Beatles Sight & Sound.

The album was issued on cassette in 1972, but has never seen a compact disc release (as was the case with non-canon Beatles albums at the time).  It remained in print until 1991, when all the Australian Beatles vinyl was deleted from EMI Music Australia catalogue and replaced with imported vinyl from the UK.

Track listing

Sales charts and certification

Australian Charts

Notes

References

External links
Fixing a hole - the great lost Aussie Beatles collection

1972 greatest hits albums
Albums produced by George Martin
Albums produced by Phil Spector
Albums arranged by George Martin
Apple Records compilation albums
The Beatles compilation albums
Albums recorded at Olympic Sound Studios
Albums recorded at Apple Studios